Streptomyces heilongjiangensis is a bacterium species from the genus of Streptomyces which has been isolated from the root surface of the soybean Glycine max in Hulin in the Heilongjiang province in China. Streptomyces heilongjiangensis produces borrelidin.

See also 
 List of Streptomyces species

References

Further reading

External links
Type strain of Streptomyces heilongjiangensis at BacDive – the Bacterial Diversity Metadatabase

heilongjiangensis
Bacteria described in 2013